Manjul Bhardwaj is an actor, director, writer, facilitator, and initiator in theatre. He is from Dahkora Village in Jhajjar District of Haryana, India. For the past 25 years, he has been based in Mumbai and dedicated himself to creating "The Theatre of Relevance." As a writer and director, he has written and directed more than 25 plays.

In 1992, Bhardwaj founded The Experimental Theatre Foundation, a pioneering theatre movement in India. He has conducted more than 300 "Theatre of Relevance" workshops for a variety of organizations, institutions and groups, in 28 states of India as well as abroad (Singapore and Germany). Brandeis University sends students for internship to understand fundamentals, principles, concepts and processes of "Theatre of Relevance".

His work has focused on issues such as child labour, people affected by HIV and AIDS , and what is known as "Sex-Selection" (the homicide of female fetus).

In 2006, he and his group were invited in "Kinder Kultur Karawane" by Buro Fur Kultur Und-Medien Projekte to Germany to perform the play "Vishwa – The World" for 41 days from 10 September to 20 October 2006. The play was performed 24 times in 13 cities of Germany (Hamburg, Ahrensburg, Berlin, Dessau, Penzberg, Biberach, Dobeln, Wiesbaden, Marburg, Chemnitz, Aschaffenburg, Freiburg and Radolfzell).

Theatre career
Bhardwaj has written or directed the following plays:

Awards/Nominations

UNFPA-Laadli Media Awards for Western Region for Gender Sensitivity 2006–07 – Category – 16. Theatre- Street Theatre Manjul Bhardwaj, Experimental Theatre Foundation

Theaters / Workshops Conducted

Corporate Trainer
Bhardwaj is also a human process facilitator and corporate trainer. He has evolved "Theatre of Relevance" based training modules in corporate and management development. He is experimenting and implementing "Theatre of Relevance" based training modules for more than a decade in reputed public and private sector companies i.e., ONGC, Indian Oil Corporation, Bharat Heavy Electricals Limited, Bharat Petroleum Corporation Limited, Tehri Hydro Development Corporation(THDC Ltd), Central Bank of India and Reliance Energy (Anil Dhirubhai Ambani Group)

His concept ‘Role of theatre of Relevance in HR’ is used as pedagogical tool to learn HR process in EMPI's Udai Pareek HR labs in EMPI Business School, Delhi. He has also intervened in understanding human processes through theatre in ISABS. He is a visiting faculty in a number of institutions, academies and organizations in India and abroad.

References 

1969 births
Living people